The BlackRock Center for the Arts, officially the Germantown Cultural Arts Center (d.b.a. BlackRock Center for the Arts), is a cultural, visual and performing arts center in Germantown, Maryland. The center is named after the nearby historic Blackrock Mill.

Overview
BlackRock Center for the Arts was founded in 2002 after the developer of Germantown town center donated land for the facility. It has an annual budget of $1.1 million. Since 2019 Lynn Arndt has served as Chief Executive Officer.

The  facility includes an art gallery, a 210-seat proscenium theater, a dance studio, a black box studio theater, a second-floor display gallery, music rooms, and visual art classrooms. It has 10 full-time and 20 part-time staff members. The center provides a range of music, dance, and arts classes, and camps, and presents a season of music, dance, and family-oriented performances.

In April 2013 it was announced that blues singer and guitarist John Hammond would provide a guitar workshop at the center.

References

Buildings and structures in Montgomery County, Maryland
Arts centers in Maryland
Tourist attractions in Montgomery County, Maryland
2002 establishments in Maryland
Germantown, Maryland
New Classical architecture